FCC Environment (UK) Limited is a waste management company headquartered in Northampton, United Kingdom and a wholly owned subsidiary of Fomento de Construcciones y Contratas. It was formed in May 2012 through the merger and rebranding of Focsa Services and Waste Recycling Group.

History
Waste Recycling Group acquired Hanson Waste Management from Hanson plc for £185 million in cash in December 2000.

Waste Recycling Group was acquired by the private equity group Terra Firma Capital Partners for £315.2 million in June 2003.

In September 2006 Fomento de Construcciones y Contratas acquired Waste Recycling Group, excluding its landfill gas operations, from Terra Firma for £1.4 billion.

In May 2012 Focsa Services and Waste Recycling Group were merged and rebranded "FCC Environment".

Services
FCC Environment's principal services are:

business waste services, including waste collection and recycling services;
municipal services, including household waste collection, street cleaning, and parks and gardens maintenance;
recycling, including provision of material recycling facilities and household waste recycling centres;
Green energy, including Energy from Waste, wind energy and energy crops, and
waste processing, including industrial waste treatment and hazardous waste and landfill disposal.

Operations
FCC Environment's head office is in Northampton with a major regional office located in Doncaster. FCC Environment has around 2,400 staff and operates around 200 facilities across England, Scotland and Wales.

See also
Allington Quarry Waste Management Facility
Greengairs Landfill
Moore Nature Reserve

References

External links
FCC Environment Home Page

Waste management companies of the United Kingdom
Private equity portfolio companies